Ehen vor Gericht is a German television series.

See also
List of German television series

External links
 

1980s German television series
1990s German television series
1970 German television series debuts
2000 German television series endings
German-language television shows
ZDF original programming
German legal television series